is a volcanic crater lake in northern Honshū island, Japan. Located in the Shimokita Peninsula of Aomori Prefecture, it is within the borders of the city of Mutsu and Shimokita Hanto Quasi-National Park.

Lake Usori is located in the volcanic Osorezan Mountains, of which the famed Mount Osore forms one portion. From the surrounding caldera walls, some ten streams drain into Lake Usori, but there is only one outlet, the 13.85 kilometer Shotsu River, which drains into the Tsugaru Strait.

The lake is noted for the extreme acidity of its water, with an average pH of around 3.4 to 3.8. Geologists attribute this to hydrogen sulfide seeping from the caldera bottom, forming sulfuric acid in the lake water. Due to its acidity, the lake is home to only one subspecies of Japanese dace, along with several insect species. However, the lake is a noted spot for waterfowl.

See Also
List of lakes in Japan
List of volcanoes in Japan

References

External links 

Lakes of Japan
Calderas of Honshū
Volcanic crater lakes
Tourist attractions in Aomori Prefecture
Landforms of Aomori Prefecture
Mutsu, Aomori